Ranong Airport  is an airport serving Ranong, a town in Ranong Province, Thailand.

Location 
Ranong airport serves the province of Ranong in the southern part of the country, it is located 500 km from Bangkok. The airport is located in a flat area at an altitude of 17 m above sea level, from the east there is a mountain range, between it and the airport territory there is highway number 4. The highest point of this area is Mount Khao Nom Sao (1089 m), 6 km from the airport.

History 
Construction started on 30 March 1993, completed on 18 May 1995. The first aircraft to receive Ranong airport was a Boeing 737 with 150 passengers on board. The main terminal area is about 4 thousand square meters and is designed for 300 passengers. In 2019, the airport served 2,237 flights and 170 thousand passengers.

Airlines and destinations

References

External links

 

Ranong
Airports in Thailand
Buildings and structures in Ranong province
Airports established in 1995